The All-Russian Zemstvo Union of Aid to Sick and Wounded Warriors, under the auspices of Her Imperial Highness Grand Duchess Elizabeth Feodorovna  was a civil society organisation set up in the Russian Empire to support sick and wounded soldiers. It was established in Moscow on 30 July 1914 at a congress of authorized provincial zemstvos. Georgy Lvov headed the organisation as Chief Commissioner. On August 11, 1914 the organisation was ratified with suitable  Regulations of the Committee by Her Imperial Highness Grand Duchess Elizabeth Feodorovna.

The organisation was funded by government subsidies, appropriations of local organisations of zemstvos and cities, and donations from private individuals. It worked alongside the Military Sanitary Department and the Red Cross, and its role gradually expanded to include  issues of evacuation and treatment of the wounded, hospital equipment, sanitary trains, medical-nutritional and bannoprachechnyh detachments, assistance to refugees and prisoners of war, the organisation of warehouses for linen, supply of troops with uniforms, etc. As these functions expanded, various departments were created in the unions: medical-sanitary, evacuation, for the preparation of medicines and dressings, Sanitary equipment trains, assistance to refugees and some others.

References

Russian Empire in World War I
1914 in the Russian Empire